Δ4-Abiraterone (D4A; code name CB-7627), also known as 17-(3-pyridyl)androsta-4,16-dien-3-one, is a steroidogenesis inhibitor and active metabolite of abiraterone acetate, a drug which is used in the treatment of prostate cancer and is itself a prodrug of abiraterone (another active metabolite of abiraterone acetate). D4A is formed from abiraterone by 3β-hydroxysteroid dehydrogenase/Δ5-4 isomerase (3β-HSD). It is said to be a more potent inhibitor of steroidogenesis than abiraterone, and is partially responsible for the activity of abiraterone acetate.

D4A is specifically an inhibitor of CYP17A1 (17α-hydroxylase/17,20-lyase), 3β-HSD, and 5α-reductase. In addition, it has also been found to act as a competitive antagonist of the androgen receptor (AR), with potency reportedly comparable to that of enzalutamide. However, the initial 5α-reduced metabolite of D4A, 3-keto-5α-abiraterone, is an agonist of the AR, and has been found to stimulate prostate cancer progression. The formation of this metabolite can be blocked by the coadministration of dutasteride, a selective and highly potent 5α-reductase inhibitor, and the addition of this medication may improve the effectiveness of abiraterone acetate in the treatment of prostate cancer.

References

{{DISPLAYTITLE:Δ4-Abiraterone}}

3β-Hydroxysteroid dehydrogenase inhibitors
5α-Reductase inhibitors
Androstanes
CYP17A1 inhibitors
Hormonal antineoplastic drugs
Human drug metabolites
Enones
Prostate cancer
3-Pyridyl compounds
Steroidal antiandrogens